Sandino Municipal Museum is a museum located in Sandino, Cuba. It was established on 14 December 1980.

It has five rooms and holds several collections on archaeology, history, fauna and flora.

See also 
 List of museums in Cuba

References 

Museums in Cuba
Buildings and structures in Pinar del Río Province
Museum
Museums established in 1980
1980 establishments in Cuba
20th-century architecture in Cuba